Žirmūnai Bridge is a bridge across Neris River, that connects Žirmūnai and Antakalnis districts of Vilnius. This is a pier ferroconcrete bridge 181 meters (594 ft) long. It has three spans and four piers. The width between handrails is 20 meters (66 ft). The bridge is a 1964 project by Leningrad institute "Promtransniiproject". It was built in 1965 by the Second Vilnius Bridge Construction Administration. In 1971 authors of the project headed by Solomon Gershanok and constructors were awarded the Council of Ministers Prize.

Sources
 "Lietuvos TSR kultūros ir paminklų sąvadas", Vilnius, Vyriausioji enciklopedijų redakcija,1988, pp. 563–564 

Bridges completed in 1965
Road bridges in Lithuania
Bridges in Vilnius
Bridges built in the Soviet Union